Samantha Jane Rollinson is a British fashion model.

Early life 
Rollinson was born in Doncaster, South Yorkshire, and has an older brother called Ben. She began modelling at 13, after she was scouted by Select Model Management at The Clothes Show Live, and after signing a contract in London, she was sent on test shoots.

Career 
At age 15, Rollinson shot her first campaign, photographed by Mario Testino, for Burberry; alongside model Rosie Huntington-Whiteley and actor Douglas Booth. Her first runway show happened in 2012, walking exclusively for Balenciaga and closing the show. After her debut, Rollinson walked in over 63 shows for designers including Chanel, Altuzarra, Stella McCartney, Chloé, Hermès, Celine, Saint Laurent, Emilia Wickstead, Dior, Prada, Louis Vuitton, Victoria Beckham, Vera Wang, Marc Jacobs, Fendi, Roberto Cavalli, Christopher Kane, Jil Sander, and Marni.

She has appeared on the cover of British, Serbian, Japanese, and Singaporean editions of  Harper's Bazaar, Wonderland, and i-D as well as campaigns for Chanel, Balenciaga, and Mulberry.

References 

Living people
1994 births
People from Doncaster
People from London
English female models
Select Model Management models
Women Management models